Asura rhabdota is a moth of the family Erebidae. It is found on Sumatra.

References

rhabdota
Moths described in 1920
Moths of Indonesia